The 1996 Sacramento State Hornets football team represented California State University, Sacramento as a member of the Big Sky Conference during the 1996 NCAA Division I-AA football season. Led by second-year head coach John Volek, Sacramento State compiled an overall record of 1–10 with a mark of 0–7 in conference play, placing last out of eight teams in the Big Sky. The team was outscored by its opponents 466 to 248 for the season. The Hornets played home games at Hornet Stadium in Sacramento, California.

Sacramento State competed for the first time in the Big Sky Conference in 1996. They had been a member of the American West Conference (AWC) from 1993 to 1995.

Schedule

Team players in the NFL
The following Sacramento State players were selected in the 1997 NFL Draft.

References

Sacramento State
Sacramento State Hornets football seasons
Sacramento State Hornets football